Elin Gustafsson (born 1989) is a Swedish Social Democratic politician who has been a Member of the Riksdag since 2018.

References 

1989 births
Living people
Members of the Riksdag from the Social Democrats

Women members of the Riksdag
People from Alvesta Municipality
Members of the Riksdag 2018–2022
21st-century Swedish women politicians
21st-century Swedish politicians